Bambusa cerosissima is a species in the genus Bambusa, the clumping bamboo.

Distribution
Bambusa cerossissma is endemic from the Guangdong province of China to Vietnam.

Description

References

Flora of Vietnam
Flora of Guangdong
cerosissima